Franklin Hills may refer to:

 Franklin Hills, Los Angeles, a small community in the City of Los Angeles, California
 Franklin Hills (Montana), southeast of Melville, Montana